The LK (Leningradskii Komsomolyets – Leningrad young communist) was a two-seat cabin aircraft designed and built in the USSR from April 1936.

Development 
In 1930 the LIIPS ( – Leningrad institute for sail and communications engineers) formed a UK GVF ( – training centre for civil air fleet), in turn the UK GVF formed the NIAI (Naoochno-Issledovatel'skiy Aero-Institoot – scientific research aero-institute) which became the focus of several good design engineers who were given command of individual OKB (Osoboye Konstrooktorskoye Byuro – personal design/construction bureau).
One of the most prolific designers at NIAI was Grigorii Ivanovich Bakshayev, who was assigned the lead in the design of the LK two-seat sport aircraft in 1936. Constructed from welded steel truss fuselage and wooden wings, the low-wing LK had a fixed tail-wheel undercarriage, a tandem two-seat greenhouse cockpit,  and was powered by a single M-11 radial engine. Innovations on the LK included relatively large end-plates on the wings and interceptor spoiler type roll controls extending over the top surface of the wings.
The sole prototype LK was completed in July 1936, flight tests began in August 1936, and the LK also carried out a long-range flight to Moscow.

Variants 
 LIG-8 – The LIG-8 was derived from the LK with a re-stressed structure, a 300 hp (223.7 kW) MG-31 engine and a five-seat cabin. Flight testing began in 1937, and a small number were produced. Specifications for the LIG-8 were very similar to the LK but showed a marked increase in maximum speed, (245 km/h / 152 mph).

Specifications (LK)

See also

References

 Gunston, Bill. “The Osprey Encyclopaedia of Russian Aircraft 1875–1995”. London, Osprey. 1995. 

1930s Soviet civil utility aircraft
NIAI aircraft
Low-wing aircraft
Aircraft first flown in 1936